Sahebzaade is a 1992 Bollywood action film, starring Sanjay Dutt and Neelam Kothari in the title roles, while some ensemble cast have supporting roles. The story is written by Ranbir Pushp.

Story
In picturesque Himachal Pradesh live Raja, Rahul and their widowed mom, Sharda. Sharda has brought up her sons with a lot of love and affection and both have the same good nature, character and habits - so much so that they both fall in love with the same young woman, Chinar, who is the daughter of Sukhdev, and Laxmi. Raja loves Chinar and shows his love in his own style, but Chinar misunderstands this, for she has given her heart to Rahul. Chinar hopes that Raja, who is the elder of the two, gets married soon, so that her and Rahul's marriage takes place. There are misunderstandings galore, as Sharda and Raja think the proposal is for Raja, while Rahul, Sukhdev, Laxmi, and Chinar know the truth. When the truth comes out in the open, it does cause considerable friction between the brothers. Taking advantage of this are Thakur Bhanu Pratap and Mama, who also would like to marry Chinar. Then Sharda tells her sons to unite and fight against the man who killed her husband. Will her sons give up their differences to avenge their father's death, or will they each go their own way and avenge it in their own style, knowing fully well that only one can marry Chinar?

Cast
Sanjay Dutt as Raja
Neelam Kothari as Chinar
Aditya Pancholi as Rahul
Kulbhushan Kharbanda as Ghulam Rasool
Gulshan Grover as Mama
Shakti Kapoor as Bharu Pratap
Anjana Mumtaz as Shardha
Alok Nath as Kishan
Ram Mohan as Sukhdev
Rucha Gujarathi as Neelam's childhood role

Soundtrack
The music of the film was composed by Laxmikant–Pyarelal and the lyrics were penned by Hasan Kamaal.

References

External links

Actually this movie was started by starring Chunkey Pandey portraying the role of Raja, Aamir Khan portraying the role of Rahul and Sangeeta Bijlani portraying the role of Chinar but due to some creative differences the movie was kept in hold and started again with new star cast of Sanjay dutt, Aaditya Pancholi and Neelam Kothari portraying the same roles.

1990s Hindi-language films
Films scored by Laxmikant–Pyarelal
Films directed by Ajay Kashyap